In mathematics, an isomorphism is a structure-preserving mapping between two structures of the same type that can be reversed by an inverse mapping. Two mathematical structures are isomorphic if an isomorphism exists between them.  The word isomorphism is derived from the Ancient Greek: ἴσος isos "equal", and μορφή morphe "form" or "shape".

The interest in isomorphisms lies in the fact that two isomorphic objects have the same properties (excluding further information such as additional structure or names of objects). Thus isomorphic structures cannot be distinguished from the point of view of structure only, and may be identified.

An automorphism is an isomorphism from a structure to itself. An isomorphism between two structures is a canonical isomorphism  (a canonical map that is an isomorphism) if there is only one isomorphism between the two structures (as is the case for solutions of a universal property), or if the isomorphism is much more natural (in some sense) than other isomorphisms. For example, for every prime number , all fields with  elements are canonically isomorphic, with a unique isomorphism. The isomorphism theorems provide canonical isomorphisms that are not unique.

The term  is mainly used for algebraic structures. In this case, mappings are called homomorphisms, and a homomorphism is an isomorphism if and only if it is bijective.

In various areas of mathematics, isomorphisms have received specialized names, depending on the type of structure under consideration. For example:
 An isometry is an isomorphism of metric spaces.
 A homeomorphism is an isomorphism of topological spaces.
 A diffeomorphism is an isomorphism of spaces equipped with a differential structure, typically differentiable manifolds.
 A symplectomorphism is an isomorphism of symplectic manifolds.
 A permutation is an automorphism of a set.
 In geometry, isomorphisms and automorphisms are often called transformations, for example rigid transformations, affine transformations, projective transformations.

Category theory, which can be viewed as a formalization of the concept of mapping between structures, provides a language that may be used to unify the approach to these different aspects of the basic idea.

Examples

Logarithm and exponential
Let  be the multiplicative group of positive real numbers, and let  be the additive group of real numbers.

The logarithm function  satisfies  for all  so it is a group homomorphism.  The exponential function  satisfies  for all  so it too is a homomorphism.

Since  is a homomorphism that has an inverse that is also a homomorphism,  is an isomorphism of groups.

The  function is an isomorphism which translates multiplication of positive real numbers into addition of real numbers.  This facility makes it possible to multiply real numbers using a ruler and a table of logarithms, or using a slide rule with a logarithmic scale.

Integers modulo 6
Consider the group  the integers from 0 to 5 with addition modulo 6.  Also consider the group  the ordered pairs where the x coordinates can be 0 or 1, and the y coordinates can be 0, 1, or 2, where addition in the x-coordinate is modulo 2 and addition in the y-coordinate is modulo 3.

These structures are isomorphic under addition, under the following scheme:

or in general 

For example,  which translates in the other system as 

Even though these two groups "look" different in that the sets contain different elements, they are indeed isomorphic: their structures are exactly the same.

Relation-preserving isomorphism
If one object consists of a set X with a binary relation R and the other object consists of a set Y with a binary relation S then an isomorphism from X to Y is a bijective function  such that:

S is reflexive, irreflexive, symmetric, antisymmetric, asymmetric, transitive, total, trichotomous, a partial order, total order, well-order, strict weak order, total preorder (weak order), an equivalence relation, or a relation with any other special properties, if and only if R is.

For example, R is an ordering ≤ and S an ordering  then an isomorphism from X to Y is a bijective function  such that

If  then this is a relation-preserving automorphism.

Applications
In algebra, isomorphisms are defined for all algebraic structures. Some are more specifically studied; for example:
 Linear isomorphisms between vector spaces; they are specified by invertible matrices.
 Group isomorphisms between groups; the classification of isomorphism classes of finite groups is an open problem.
 Ring isomorphism between rings. 
 Field isomorphisms are the same as ring isomorphism between fields; their study, and more specifically the study of field automorphisms is an important part of Galois theory.

Just as the automorphisms of an algebraic structure form a group, the isomorphisms between two algebras sharing a common structure form a heap. Letting a particular isomorphism identify the two structures turns this heap into a group.

In mathematical analysis, the Laplace transform is an isomorphism mapping hard differential equations into easier algebraic equations.

In mathematical analysis, an isomorphism between two Hilbert spaces is a bijection preserving addition, scalar multiplication, and inner product.

In early theories of logical atomism, the formal relationship between facts and true propositions was theorized by Bertrand Russell and Ludwig Wittgenstein to be isomorphic. An example of this line of thinking can be found in Russell's Introduction to Mathematical Philosophy.

In cybernetics, the good regulator or Conant–Ashby theorem is stated "Every good regulator of a system must be a model of that system". Whether regulated or self-regulating, an isomorphism is required between the regulator and processing parts of the system.

Category theoretic view
In category theory, given a category C, an isomorphism is a morphism  that has an inverse morphism  that is,  and  For example, a bijective linear map is an isomorphism between vector spaces, and a bijective continuous function whose inverse is also continuous is an isomorphism between topological spaces, called a homeomorphism.

Isomorphism vs. bijective morphism
In a concrete category (roughly, a category whose objects are sets (perhaps with extra structure) and whose morphisms are structure-preserving functions), such as the category of topological spaces or categories of algebraic objects (like the category of groups, the category of rings, and the category of modules), an isomorphism must be bijective on the underlying sets.  In algebraic categories (specifically, categories of varieties in the sense of universal algebra), an isomorphism is the same as a homomorphism which is bijective on underlying sets.  However, there are concrete categories in which bijective morphisms are not necessarily isomorphisms (such as the category of topological spaces).

Relation with equality

Equality is when two objects are exactly the same, and everything that is true about one object is true about the other, while an isomorphism implies everything that is true about a designated part of one object's structure is true about the other's. For example, the sets

These are isomorphic as sets, since finite sets are determined up to isomorphism by their cardinality (number of elements) and these both have three elements, but there are many choices of isomorphism—one isomorphism is
 while another is 
and no one isomorphism is intrinsically better than any other. On this view and in this sense, these two sets are not equal because one cannot consider them : one can choose an isomorphism between them, but that is a weaker claim than identity—and valid only in the context of the chosen isomorphism.

Another example is more formal and more directly illustrates the motivation for distinguishing equality from isomorphism: the distinction between a finite-dimensional vector space V and its dual space  of linear maps from V to its field of scalars 
These spaces have the same dimension, and thus are isomorphic as abstract vector spaces (since algebraically, vector spaces are classified by dimension, just as sets are classified by cardinality), but there is no "natural" choice of isomorphism 
If one chooses a basis for V, then this yields an isomorphism: For all 

This corresponds to transforming a column vector (element of V) to a row vector (element of V*) by transpose, but a different choice of basis gives a different isomorphism: the isomorphism "depends on the choice of basis".
More subtly, there  a map from a vector space V to its double dual  that does not depend on the choice of basis: For all 

This intuitive notion of "an isomorphism that does not depend on an arbitrary choice" is formalized in the notion of a natural transformation; briefly, that one may  identify, or more generally map from, a finite-dimensional vector space to its double dual,  for  vector space in a consistent way. Formalizing this intuition is a motivation for the development of category theory.

However, there is a case where the distinction between natural isomorphism and equality is usually not made. That is for the objects that may be characterized by a universal property. In fact, there is a unique isomorphism, necessarily natural, between two objects sharing the same universal property. A typical example is the set of real numbers, which may be defined through infinite decimal expansion, infinite binary expansion, Cauchy sequences, Dedekind cuts and many other ways. Formally, these constructions define different objects which are all solutions with the same universal property. As these objects have exactly the same properties, one may forget the method of construction and consider them as equal. This is what everybody does when referring to " set of the real numbers". The same occurs with quotient spaces: they are commonly constructed as sets of equivalence classes. However, referring to a set of sets may be counterintuitive, and so quotient spaces are commonly considered as a pair of a set of undetermined objects, often called "points", and a surjective map onto this set.

This convention is not universally followed, and authors who wish to distinguish between unnatural isomorphisms and natural isomorphisms will generally explicitly state the distinction.

Most often, one speaks of equality of two subsets of a given set (as in the integer set example above), but not of two objects abstractly presented. For example, the 2-dimensional unit sphere in 3-dimensional space
 and the Riemann sphere 
which can be presented as the one-point compactification of the complex plane   as the complex projective line (a quotient space)

are three different descriptions for a mathematical object, all of which are isomorphic, but not  because they are not all subsets of a single space: the first is a subset of  the second is  plus an additional point, and the third is a subquotient of 

In the context of category theory, objects are usually at most isomorphic—indeed, a motivation for the development of category theory was showing that different constructions in homology theory yielded equivalent (isomorphic) groups. Given maps between two objects X and Y, however, one asks if they are equal or not (they are both elements of the set  hence equality is the proper relationship), particularly in commutative diagrams.

See also: homotopy type theory, in which isomorphisms can be treated as kinds of equality.

See also

Bisimulation
Equivalence relation
Heap (mathematics)
Isometry
Isomorphism class
Isomorphism theorem
Universal property
Coherent isomorphism

Notes

References

Further reading

External links

Morphisms
Equivalence (mathematics)